Ernest Lamont Johnson Jr. (September 30, 1922 – October 24, 2010) was an American actor and film director who has appeared in and directed many television shows and movies. He won two Emmy Awards.

Early  years
Johnson was born in Stockton, California, the son of Ruth Alice (née Fairchild) and Ernest Lamont Johnson, who was a realtor. He attended Pasadena Junior College and UCLA and was active in theatrical productions at both schools.

Acting 
When he was 16, Johnson began his career in radio, eventually playing the role of Tarzan in a popular syndicated series in 1951. He also worked as a newscaster and a disc jockey. Johnson was also one of several actors to play Archie Goodwin in The New Adventures of Nero Wolfe, opposite Sydney Greenstreet on NBC Radio. He then turned to films and television, first as an actor, then as a director.

Directing 
Johnson's directing debut came in 1948 with the play Yes Is For a Very Young Man in New York. His television directing debut was on an episode of NBC Matinee Theater.
Johnson also directed productions of the operas The Man in the Moon (1959), Iphigénie en Tauride (1962), and Orfeo (1990), and he directed an installment of the series Felicity plus the TV movie The Man Next Door (1996).

Recognition 
Johnson was nominated for nine Emmy Awards, winning twice, for Wallenberg: A Hero's Story (1985) and Lincoln (1988) — both for Outstanding Directing For A Miniseries Movie Or A Dramatic Special. He was nominated in the same category for Crash Landing: The Rescue of Flight 232 (1992), Unnatural Causes (1987), Ernie Kovacs: Between the Laughter (1984), Fear on Trial (1975), The Execution of Private Slovik (1974) and That Certain Summer (1972). His other Emmy nomination was for Outstanding Miniseries or Movie, also for Wallenberg: A Hero's Story.

Johnson won five Directors Guild of America Awards, winning in the category Movies for Television and Mini-Series for Lincoln (1988) and for That Certain Summer (1972). He also won DGA Awards for Most Outstanding TV Director (1972) and for Television — My Sweet Charlie (1970) and "Oscar Underwood Story": Profiles in Courage (1964). Additionally, he was nominated for DGA Awards for Movies for Television and Mini-Series for Wallenberg: A Hero's Story (1985), Fear on Trial (1975) and The Execution of Private Slovik (1974). Another DGA Award nomination was for Dramatic Series for Birdbath (1971).

Personal life
Johnson married actress Toni Merrill in Paris in 1945. They had three children: Jeremy, Carolyn, and Christopher Anthony.

Death 
Johnson died of heart failure in Monterey, California, October 24, 2010.

Filmography

Actor
Up Front (1951) - Miller (uncredited)
Retreat, Hell! (1952) - Capt. 'Tink' O'Grady
Sally and Saint Anne (1952) - Willie O'Moyne
The Glory Brigade (1953) - Capt. Adams (uncredited)
Hallmark Hall of Fame (1954, TV Series)
The Human Jungle (1954) - Det. Lannigan
Goodyear Television Playhouse (1955, TV Series)
Alfred Hitchcock Presents (1956, TV Series) - David Schaffner
Please Murder Me (1956) - Carl Holt
Crusader (1956, TV Series) - Lt. Joseph Balta
The Brothers Rico (1957) - Peter Malaks
Jet Pilot (1957) - Sergeant (uncredited)
Alcoa Theatre (1959, TV Series) - Col. von Schlabrendorff
Angel (1961, TV Series) - Lazlo
Blue Light (1966, Episode: "Jet Trail") - Col. Von Kreuzer
The Big Valley (1966, TV Series) - Anson Cross
Felony Squad (1967, TV Series) - Col. Bix Gabriel
Gunsmoke (1967, TV Series) - Stoner
The McKenzie Break (1970) - PT Boat Captain (uncredited)
The Last American Hero (1973) - Hotel Desk Clerk (uncredited)
One on One (1977) - Barry Brunz
Shogun Assassin (1980) - (voice) (final film role)

Director
Have Gun – Will Travel (1958-1959)
Peter Gunn (1958-1959)
Mr. Lucky (1959-1960)
Naked City (1960)
Dr. Kildare (1961-1963)
The Twilight Zone (1961-1963)
A Covenant with Death (1967)
The Name of the Game (1968-1969)
Judd for the Defense (1968)
The McKenzie Break (1970)
My Sweet Charlie (1970)
A Gunfight (1971)
The Groundstar Conspiracy (1972)
That Certain Summer (1972)
You'll Like My Mother (1972)
The Last American Hero (1973)
The Execution of Private Slovik (1974)
Visit to a Chief's Son (1974)
Fear on Trial (1975)
Lipstick (1976)
One on One (1977)
Cattle Annie and Little Britches (1981)
Crisis At Central High (1981)
Spacehunter: Adventures in the Forbidden Zone (1983)
Voices Within: The Lives of Truddi Chase (1990)

References

External links
 
 Lamont Johnson at the TV Museum
 
 New York Times bio
 New York Times obituary, October 27, 2010: Lamont Johnson, Emmy-Winning Director, Dies at 88
 

1922 births
2010 deaths
American male film actors
American male radio actors
American television directors
Primetime Emmy Award winners
People from Stockton, California
German-language film directors
Film directors from California
University of California, Los Angeles alumni